Jin Bora (born November 14, 1987) is a South Korean jazz pianist, composer, music arranger, and CF model.

Biography 
Jin Bora is a professional musician despite her young age. She considers herself first and foremost a pianist. She began playing the piano from age 3, when she was acknowledged to have absolute pitch. Her career is young but has already made an impact.

Education
Jin left school in her second year of middle school and began home schooling. She studied at the Berklee College of Music as a scholarship student.

Career
Jin took top prize in jazz at the 2001 Seoul Artspool Conservatory Concours and performed in small and large concerts as well as cultural events. Such as KEPCO Artspool Center, Seoul Grand Park, Samsung Open Tide, Chularm Festival of Taebak City, Chuncheon International Mime Centre (Into the Jazz & Rock Festival), Kwangju International Film Festival, Sungkyunkwan University, Busan Cultural Center, Asiana International Short Film Festival, Seoul Arts Center, Sejung Culture Center for the French Embassy, O-San Culture Center, Incheon Culture Center, Guchang Culture Center and she appeared on most KBS programs.

References

1987 births
Living people
People from Incheon
Musicians from Incheon
South Korean pianists
South Korean women pianists
21st-century pianists
21st-century women pianists